London Buses route 211 is a Transport for London contracted bus route in London, England. Running between Hammersmith bus station and Waterloo station, it is operated by London United.

History
Route 211 was introduced on 17 July 1993 replacing Red Arrow route 511 between Waterloo and Victoria stations, before continuing to Hammersmith bus station along the existing route 11, replacing the latter north of Fulham Broadway station.

It was operated by London General until June 1998 when upon retendering passed to Travel London who introduced a fleet of Optare Excels. It was included in the sale of Travel London to Limebourne Buses in August 2000 and again to Connex in July 2001. In November 2002 the service received new Alexander ALX400 bodied Dennis Trident 2s with the service upgraded in preparation for the introduction of the London congestion charge.

Route 211 was included in the sale of the business back to Travel London in February 2004 which in turn was sold to Abellio London in May 2009.

On 30 June 2012, brand new Alexander Dennis Enviro400s and Alexander Dennis Enviro400Hs were introduced. In June 2016 the route began being operated using New Routemasters.

On 29 January 2019 the route transferred to London United. The route is due to be shortened in the future.

Current route
Route 211 operates via these primary locations:
Hammersmith bus station  for Hammersmith stations  
Fulham Broadway station 
Chelsea & Westminster Hospital
Royal Marsden Hospital
Royal Brompton Hospital
Chelsea Old Town Hall
King's Road
Sloane Square station 
Victoria Coach station 
Victoria bus station  for Victoria station  
Westminster Abbey
Parliament Square
Westminster station 
Westminster Bridge
Waterloo station   Cab Road

References

External links

Bus routes in London
Transport in the London Borough of Hammersmith and Fulham
Transport in the Royal Borough of Kensington and Chelsea
Transport in the London Borough of Lambeth
Transport in the City of Westminster